Oboler is a surname. Notable people with the surname include:

Arch Oboler (1909–1987), American playwright, screenwriter, novelist, producer, and director
Eli M. Oboler (1915–1983), American librarian
Suzanne Oboler, Peruvian-American scholar